Pound is the surname of:

 Albert Pound (1831-?), American politician and businessman
 Cuthbert Winfred Pound (1864–1935), American lawyer and politician from New York
 Dick Pound (born 1942), Canadian lawyer
 Dudley Pound (1877–1943), British naval officer
 Ezra Pound (1885–1972), American expatriate poet and critic
 Glenn Simpson Pound (1914-2010), American educator
 James Pound (1669–1724), English clergyman and astronomer
 Jessie Brown Pounds (1861–1921), American writer of gospel songs
 Louise Pound (1872–1958), American folklorist and college professor
 Omar Pound (1926–2010), Anglo-American writer, teacher, and translator
 Robert Pound (1919–2010), American physicist
 Roscoe Pound (1870–1964), American legal scholar and educator
 Stephen Pound (born 1948), British Labour Party politician
 Stephen Bosworth Pound (1833–1911), lawyer, senator and judge
 Thaddeus C. Pound (1833–1914), American politician and businessman, brother of Albert Pound and grandfather of Ezra Pound